Daily Bread may refer to:

 Daily Bread (Charles Gayle album), 1995
 Daily Bread, a 2005 album by Corey Harris

See also

 Our Daily Bread (disambiguation)
 "Give us this day our daily bread", from the Lord's Prayer
 Epiousios, an adjective applied to "bread" in the Lord's prayer and usually translated as "daily"